Ayngaran International is a film distribution and production company, based in the United Kingdom. Historically, Tamil films from India have been distributed to overseas theaters and for home media consumption by Ayngaran. The chairman of the company is Mr.Karunamoorthy who is based out of London and he is one of the pioneers in this field who took Tamil cinema to the worldwide audience. It also operates a chain of retail video stores located in the United Kingdom, France, Canada, Malaysia, and Singapore.

As of 2008, the company debuted as an independent film studio, opening offices in India. Its first production was Karuppu Roja (1996).

History

Film production
Ayngaran International made its first foray into film production with the 1996 horror film Karuppu Roja, directed by Aabavanan, but the venture's failure prompted them to prioritise European distribution ventures. In 2006, Ayngaran International entered into a joint venture with Eros International and announced plans to begin producing and distributing films on a larger scale. Its first distribution venture as a joint venture, Shankar's Rajinikanth-starrer Sivaji, became a very profitable venture and soon after, Ayngaran announced plans to begin producing films. Subsequently, it was announced that they would produce the director and actor's next collaboration, Enthiran (2010), dubbed as the most expensive Tamil film ever made, along with Eros International. However, in December 2008, Eros International withdrew from the joint venture after financial difficulties caused by the box-office failure of Drona (2008) and Yuvvraaj (2008), while Ayngaran International itself, struggled with the global financial crisis of 2008. The film's production and release rights were consequently sold on to Sun Pictures, who released the film.

After enjoying success as the worldwide co-distributors of the Ajith Kumar-starrer Billa (2007), they signed the actor on to appear in their production Aegan (2008), which was directed by Raju Sundaram. Simultaneously they produced Prabhu Deva's Villu (2009) with Vijay in the lead role, but both films did not perform well commercially. The failure of both their big-budget films and their other venture Vishnuvardhan's Sarvam (2009), coupled with their withdrawal from Enthiran, put the release of several of their other projects into doubt. While smaller films like Peranmai (2009) and Angadi Theru (2010) managed to release and perform well at the box office, other ventures including Mysskin's Nandalala (2010), Murattu Kaalai (2012) and the Prabhu Deva-starrer Kalavaadiya Pozhuthugal (2017) experienced severe delays as a result of financial restraints, however latter got released in 2017. Likewise Ayngaran's films shot in the late 2000s like the Jai-starrer Arjunan Kadhali and the Jeevan-starrer Krishnaleelai remain unreleased, while projects such as the A. R. Rahman musical, Kadhir's Manavar Dhinam with Vinay, were shelved after being launched.

The studio continued distributing films throughout the 2010s and made a return to production through Kaththi (2014), which was co-produced by Lyca Productions. The success of the film meant that Ayngaran International were actively looking to make a return to the film industry, and announced that they would finance Anand Shankar's Marma Manithan with Vikram and Kajal Aggarwal starring. However, subsequently they opted against making the film and the project was taken up by different producers.

Retail stores
Ayngaran International has several retail stores across the world, located in cities such as London, Toronto, Paris, Sydney, and Singapore. Other partner sites are located in Sri Lanka and Malaysia.

Filmography
Ayngaran introduced the six-track DTS sound system to the Indian Cinema Industry through its inaugural production feature Karuppu Roja in 1996.

References

External links 
 Ayngaran International Official Website
 IMDB Profile

Film distributors of the United Kingdom
Film production companies of Tamil Nadu